Linarolo is a comune (municipality) in the Province of Pavia in the Italian region Lombardy, located about 35 km south of Milan and about 9 km east of Pavia. As of 31 December 2004, it had a population of 2,200 and an area of 12.3 km2.

The municipality of Linarolo contains the frazioni (subdivisions, mainly villages and hamlets) Ospedaletto, San Leonardo, and Vaccarizza.

Linarolo borders the following municipalities: Albaredo Arnaboldi, Albuzzano, Belgioioso, Mezzanino, Travacò Siccomario, Valle Salimbene.

Demographic evolution

References

Cities and towns in Lombardy